The Pièces de clavecin en concerts, published in 1741, constitute the only chamber music by Jean-Philippe Rameau and were composed in full maturity; they came after his music for solo harpsichord, and were published before his opera Platée.

They are very different from the trio sonatas in the Italian manner (such as those of Corelli), where the harpsichord is only providing the role of a continuo bass. In Rameau's works, the harpsichord is at the heart of the ensemble, playing a fully written-out obbligato part with virtuosity, with the accompaniment falling to the violin and viola da gamba. Rameau provided for differing instrumental combinations: the flute can replace the violin and a second violin can replace the viola da gamba. It is possible to compare these works with the violin sonatas of Johann Sebastian Bach, written earlier, around 1720, in which the melodic material is shared equally between the violin and harpsichord and the harpsichord part is obbligato nearly throughout.

They are divided into five concerts of three to four movements with typical French 'character' names, some of which can be enigmatic: a name of a place (Le Vézinet), of character (La timide, L'agaçante) or of persons (La Forqueray, La Marais, La Rameau). The last type of appellation was not used by Jean-Philippe Rameau for his solo harpsichord works.

Premier concert
First Concert in C minor, RCT 7:
La Coulicam
La Livri: Rondeau Gracieux
Le Vézinet
c. 10 mins

Deuxième concert
Second Concert in G major, RCT 8:
La Laborde
La Boucon: Air Gracieux
L'agaçante
Premier menuet, Deuxième menuet
c. 19 minutes

Troisième concert
Third Concert in A major, RCT 9:
 La Lapoplinière
 La timide: 1er Rondeau, 2e Rondeau
 Premier tambourin, Deuxième tambourin en Rondeau
c. 13 minutes

Quatrième concert
Fourth Concert in B flat major, RCT 10:
La pantomime
L'indiscrète: Rondeau
La Rameau
c. 11 minutes

Cinquième concert
Fifth Concert in D minor, RCT 11:
La Forqueray: Fugue
La Cupis
La Marais
c. 13 minutes

Recordings
Channel Records, Trevor Pinnock (harpsichord), Rachel Podger (violin), Jonathan Manson (cello)
 Sony Classical SK 45868, John Steele Ritter (harpsichord), Isaac Stern (violin), Jean-Pierre Rampal (flute)

Notes

External links

Chamber music compositions
Compositions for harpsichord
Compositions by Jean-Philippe Rameau
1741 compositions